The Viro sugar factory, commonly referred to as just Viro, is a sugar refinery based in Virovitica, Croatia. The company's shares are listed on the Zagreb Stock Exchange (ZSE) and is one of the 25 companies included in its official share index CROBEX as of September 2010.

The refinery was originally built in 1980 and had the daily refining capacity of 4,000 tons of sugar beet. Established as an independent company, it was briefly part of the PIK Virovitica agricultural company between 1984 and 1991. In the 1990s the refinery experienced a steady decline in revenue and income which resulted in it being bought and re-bought several times in the late 1990s, before eventually being acquired by the Dutch company Cosun and shortly after that filing for bankruptcy in 1999, with debts totaling some 575 million HRK. After a period of internal restructuring the refinery's property was sold to two Croatian-based companies for 110 million HRK in 2002, after which the company was re-established as a limited liability company in September 2002. The company's shares were listed on the Zagreb Stock Exchange in April 2006.

The company had managed to successfully bounce back in the late 2000s and it became the biggest such refinery in Croatia, with a 37 percent market share in the local sugar refining sector as of 2007.

In April 2006, Vir's shares began to be listed on the Zagreb Stock Exchange. The sugar factory will soon become the largest sugar refinery, which in 2007 had a 37% market share.

On May 2, 2020, although it was the most technologically advanced sugar factory in Croatia, although Virovitica was promoted as a “sweet city”, Viro will no longer produce sugar from sugar beet and will not be this year's sugar beet campaign due to “business rationalization”. There remains very little questionable possibility of sugar cane processing, the so-called “yellow campaign”. Most workers will be laid off by management on severance pay (or minimum wage until the end of the year, with questionable status thereafter) or will retire if they have the conditions.

References

External links
 

Food and drink companies of Croatia
Food and drink companies established in 2002
Companies listed on the Zagreb Stock Exchange
Sugar companies
Croatian brands
Agriculture companies of Croatia
Croatian companies established in 2002
Agriculture companies established in 2002